Peperomia vidaliana is a species of herb from the genus Peperomia. It was discovered by William Trelease in 1936. Collected specimens date back to 1876 in Paris. Vidaliana came from the surname "Vidal-Sénège". This refers to the species being collected by M. Vidal-Sénège. Peperomia vidaliana is endemic to Peru. Specimens were collected by M. Vidal-Sénège in 1876–1877.

It is a glabrous herb added with pink. It has a slender stem. leaves alternate from oval and lance-shaped, sharp on both sides, it is 5.5 centimeters long and 1-2 centimeters wide. It is 5-nerved. Petioles are 5 millimeters long; Positioned spikes, young 10 millimeters long and 1 millimeter thick, with a short stalk supporting the inflorescence.

References

vidaliana
Flora of Peru
Plants described in 1936
Taxa named by William Trelease